Eccedoxa thenara is a moth in the family Lecithoceridae. It was described by Chun-Sheng Wu in 2001. It is found in Sri Lanka.

References

Moths described in 2001
Torodorinae